Chris Cook (born 16 April 1991) is an English rugby union player, who currently plays at scrum-half for Zebre Parma in United Rugby Championship.

A product of the Bath Rugby academy, Cook made his Aviva Premiership debut as a substitute against Sale Sharks. He spent the first half of the 2013-14 season playing for Bath's "A" team, before being loaned out to promotion hopefuls London Welsh.

Cook returned to Bath for the 2014-15 season on a new one-year deal, starting his first Premiership game in their second match of the season, against his former team London Welsh. Cook scored the game's first try, and his first in a Premiership campaign, within two minutes.

After 11 seasons playing for Bath, Cook announced he was leaving Bath to sign for local rivals Bristol Bears from the 2020-21 season.

On 26 July 2021, Cook signs for Premiership rivals Northampton Saints on a short-term deal from the beginning of the 2021-22 season.

After playing for England U20 in 2011, in 2019 Cook was named in the England Sevens squad.

On 20 January 2022, Cook left England to join Italy region Zebre Parma in the United Rugby Championship on a short-term deal for the remainder of the 2021-22 season.

References 

1991 births
Living people
Bath Rugby players
Bristol Bears players
English rugby union players
London Welsh RFC players
Northampton Saints players
Rugby union players from Bath, Somerset
Rugby union scrum-halves
Zebre Parma players
People educated at Millfield